Talitha is a genus of thrips in the family Phlaeothripidae.

Species
 Talitha cincta
 Talitha fusca
 Talitha glandifera

References

Phlaeothripidae
Thrips
Thrips genera